The 1870 Mongonui by-election was a by-election held on 30 March 1870 in the  electorate during the 4th New Zealand Parliament.

The by-election was caused by the resignation of the incumbent MP Thomas Ball on 1 March 1870. The by-election was won by Thomas Gillies.

Results
The following table gives the election result:

References

Mongonui 1870
1870 elections in New Zealand
Politics of the Northland Region
Far North District